The Central Electrical and Mechanical Engineering Service is a Central Civil Services Group-A Gazetted technical post of the Government of India. It comes under the Central Public Works Department, of the Ministry of Urban Development.

References

Indian Engineering Services